Nondugl Rural LLG is a local-level government (LLG) of Jiwaka Province, Papua New Guinea.

Wards
01. Bamna/Bamuna 1
02. Bamna/Bamuna 2
03. Domil 1
04. Domil 2
05. Kapalku 1
06. Kapalku 2
07. Kaming 1
08. Kombulno 1
09. Kombulno 2
10. Kombulno 3
11. Kumbal 1
12. Kumbal 2
13. Milep 1
14. Milep 2
15. Munumul 1
16. Munumul 2
17. Munumul 3
18. Nondugl 1
19. Nondugl 2
20. Ngumbkora
21. Onil 1

References

Local-level governments of Jiwaka Province